Doom Patrol may refer to:

 Doom Patrol, the DC Comics comic book version of the team
 Doom Patrol (TV series), a TV series based on the DC Comics team
 "Doom Patrol" (Titans episode), an episode of Titans
 Doom Patrol (album), an album by Omar Rodríguez-López